Leonard Ray "Lenny" Metz (July 6, 1899 – February 24, 1953) was a Major League Baseball shortstop who played for the Philadelphia Phillies from  to .

External links 

1890s births
1953 deaths
Philadelphia Phillies players
Major League Baseball shortstops
Baseball players from Colorado